Kurilian means "of or having to do with the Kuril Islands". It may more specifically refer to:

 The geography or other features of the Kuril Islands (also called Kurile, Kurilsky, Kurilskiye, or Chishima Islands)
 Peoples of the Kuril Islands:
 Ainu people (original inhabitants)
 Japanese people (settlers from 1869 to 1946) 
 Russian people (settlers from 1943 to present)
 Kurilian dispute or Kuril Islands dispute – conflict between Russia and Japan over the southern Kuril Islands
 Kurilian Bobtail, a breed of domestic cat

See also 
 Karelian (disambiguation)